This is a list of notable alumni, faculty, and administrators of Emerson College, a private university located in Boston, Massachusetts.

References

Lists of people by university or college in Massachusetts
Boston-related lists